Borawskie may refer to the following places:
Borawskie, Gmina Jedwabne in Podlaskie Voivodeship (north-east Poland)
Borawskie, Gmina Przytuły in Podlaskie Voivodeship (north-east Poland)
Borawskie, Warmian-Masurian Voivodeship (north Poland)